Daphne grueningiana is a shrub, of the family Thymelaeaceae. It is native to China, specifically Anhui and Zhejiang.

Description
The shrub is evergreen, and grows from 0.3 to 1.0 m tall. Its grayish white or brown branches are often found in a dichotomous or whorled fashion and are thin when young. It is often found in valleys and forests at the altitude of 300 to 400 m.

References

grueningiana